Robin Vogt is an American politician. He serves as a Democratic member for the Rockingham 21st district of the New Hampshire House of Representatives.

Life and career 
Vogt attended Granite State College.

In September 2022, Vogt defeated Jacqueline Cali-Pitts in the Democratic primary election for the Rockingham 21st district of the New Hampshire House of Representatives. No candidate was nominated to challenge him in the general election. He assumed office in December 2022.

References 

Living people
Year of birth missing (living people)
Place of birth missing (living people)
Democratic Party members of the New Hampshire House of Representatives
21st-century American politicians